Reading South was a borough constituency represented in the House of Commons of the Parliament of the United Kingdom. It elected one Member of Parliament (MP) by the first past the post system of election. The constituency covered an area in and around the town of Reading in the county of Berkshire.

History 
The Reading South parliamentary constituency was first created for the 1950 general election by splitting the previous parliamentary constituency of Reading into North and South divisions. These constituencies were merged back into a single Reading constituency in for the 1955 general election.

The Reading South constituency was recreated in 1974, when the majority comprised areas outside the County Borough.  In 1983 the constituencies in Reading were reorganised, creating the new constituencies of Reading East and Reading West.

Boundaries and boundary changes
1950–1955: The County Borough of Reading wards of Church, East, Katesgrove, Minster, Redlands, and West.

It was then abolished and absorbed into the re-established Borough Constituency of Reading, with the exception of the East ward, which was transferred to Wokingham.

1974–1983: The County Borough of Reading wards of Christchurch, Park, Redlands, and Whitley, and in the Rural District of Wokingham the parishes of Arborfield and Newland, Barkham, Earley, Finchampstead, Shinfield, Sonning, Swallowfield, Winnersh, and Woodley and Sandford.

The Park ward of the County Borough of Reading was transferred from Wokingham, along with western parts of the Rural District thereof.  The remaining wards of the County Borough were previously part of the abolished Borough Constituency of Reading.

The constituency was abolished for the 1983 general election, with the majority forming the basis of the new County Constituency of Reading East. The north-western parts transferred back to Wokingham.

Members of Parliament

MPs 1950–1955

MPs 1974–1983

Election results

Elections in the 1970s

Elections in the 1950s

Politics and history of the constituency 
The Reading South parliamentary constituency was first created for the 1950 general election by splitting the previous parliamentary constituency of Reading into North and South divisions. The seat was contested and won for the Labour Party by Ian Mikardo, the sitting MP for the Reading constituency, who held the seat until it was merged back into a single Reading constituency for the 1955 general election.

The Reading South constituency was recreated in 1974, when it was contested and won for the Conservative Party by Gerard Vaughan, the sitting MP for the Reading constituency. For the 1983 general election the constituencies in Reading were reorganised, creating the new constituencies of Reading East and Reading West. Gerard Vaughan went on to hold the Reading East constituency until he stood down at the 1997 general election.

References

See also
 List of parliamentary constituencies in Berkshire

Politics of Reading, Berkshire
Parliamentary constituencies in Berkshire (historic)
Constituencies of the Parliament of the United Kingdom established in 1950
Constituencies of the Parliament of the United Kingdom disestablished in 1955
Constituencies of the Parliament of the United Kingdom established in 1974
Constituencies of the Parliament of the United Kingdom disestablished in 1983